A bayonet lug is a standard feature on most military muskets, rifles, and shotguns, and on some civilian longarms. It is intended for attaching a bayonet, which is typically a long spike or thrusting knife. The bayonet lug is the metal mount that either locks the bayonet onto the weapon or provides a base for the bayonet to rest against, so that when a bayonet thrust is made, the bayonet does not move or slip backwards. Less than 400 years ago, bayonet lugs or their predecessors that allowed them to slip over the barrel did not exist.

Prior to the lug's invention plug  bayonets were used, which were stuffed into the muzzle's end from a tight-fitting stub, rendering the firearm virtually useless and certainly preventing it from being discharged. But by the late 17th century, this type of bayonet was entirely phased out and subsequently replaced with the socket bayonet, that slides over the muzzle with the blade offset to the side, just above or underneath. The socket bayonet would be replaced by the press stud and bayonet lug. Bayonet lugs are usually located near the muzzle end of a musket, rifle, or other longarm barrel. The lug is occasionally placed on top of the barrel, if serving as the base of the front sight, or more often mounted to the side or bottom of the barrel.

See also
 Bayonet mount, a fastening mechanism

References

Firearm components